Přibyslavice, also known as Bývalá obec Přibyslavice, is a former village in the municipality of Stříbrná Skalice in the Central Bohemian Region of the Czech Republic.

History
The lands were known to be under the control of the Sázava Monastery in 1436. In 1525, the village fell under ownership of the lords of Komorní Hrádek. It stayed a small and minor settlement, having only two farms by 1654. In 1761, the Duchess Maria Theresa of Savoy bought the Kounice estate, incorporating Přibyslavice into the municipality of Stříbrná Skalice.

In 1945, the last person residing in the village died. The land is now property of the School Forest Enterprise of Kostelec nad Černými lesy, part of the Czech University of Life Sciences Prague. As of surveys done in 2006 and 2007, only two buildings remain.

In popular culture
A 15th century recreation of the village under the name Pribyslavitz features prominently in the video game Kingdom Come: Deliverance, developed by Czech studio Warhorse Studios.

References

Villages in Prague-East District
Former villages in the Czech Republic